The Salankayana (IAST: Śālaṇkāyana) dynasty of ancient India ruled a part of Andhra region in India from 300 to 440 CE. Their territory was located between the Godavari and the Krishna rivers. Their capital was located at Vengi, modern Pedavegi near Eluru in West Godavari district of Andhra Pradesh.

Salankayana is a Brahmin Sage. 
Their name is derived from their symbol and gotra name, which stood for Nandi (the bull of Shiva).

The Salankayanas succeeded the Andhra Ikshvaku dynasty and were vassals of the Pallava kings of southern India. During their time the script for Telugu began to clearly separate from that of the other South Indian and North Indian languages. Hastivarman, the first king, was one of the many kings who were defeated by Samudragupta, but were later released and paid him tribute.

The verse from the Allahabad stone pillar inscription of Samudragupta which mentions Hastivarma:
 (Lines 19–20) Whose magnanimity blended with valour was caused by (his) first capturing, and thereafter showing the favour of releasing, all the kings of Dakshiṇāpatha such as Mahēndra of Kōsala, Vyāghrarāja of Mahākāntāra, Maṇṭarāja of Kurāḷa, Mahēndragiri of Pishṭapura, Svāmidatta of Kōṭṭūra, Damana of Ēraṇḍapalla, Vishṇugōpa of Kāñchī, Nīlarāja of Avamukta, Hastivarman of Vēṅgī, Ugrasēna of Pālakka, Kubēra of Dēvarāshṭra, and Dhanañjaya of Kusthalapura.

In the late 5th century, the Salankayanas were conquered by Madhava Varma II of the Vishnukundinas.

List of kings
Devavarma
Hastiverma
Nandi Verma
Vijayadeva Verma
Vijayanandi Verma

See also
Telugu Brahmins
Telugu-Kannada script
Kadamba script
Bhattiprolu script

References

Dynasties of India
History of Andhra Pradesh